"The Next Time I Fall" is a song written by Bobby Caldwell and Paul Gordon and recorded by a duet of Peter Cetera and Amy Grant for Cetera's 1986 album Solitude/Solitaire. It reached number one on Billboard magazine's Hot 100 and Adult Contemporary chart and was nominated for a Grammy Award for Best Pop Performance by a Duo or Group with Vocals. In February 2020, it was listed on a Billboard pop music list of top 25 love song duets.

Background

Songwriter Paul Gordon recalled working on the project with Bobby Caldwell. "Bobby had just moved into a new apartment, and all he had was a drum machine and a chair. We spent a couple of inspired days knocking out that song. It was a lot of fun working with Bobby." The feeling was mutual for Caldwell: "Yes, writing with Paul was a great experience. Sometimes these collaborations click and sometimes not, but this was a smooth and painless venture." 

Gordon explained that Caldwell did the vocals on the demo and that they wrote the song for Cetera to sing. "And even when he was no longer in Chicago we decided to stick with him." Caldwell confirmed, "We did indeed write the song for Chicago and their lead vocalist Peter Cetera. We had his voice in mind, but Paul and I were unaware that he was leaving Chicago at that time, and when we heard the news our hopes were dashed. However, a short time later, I got a call at home from Cetera himself who stumbled upon our demo cassette tape of the song in producer/arranger David Foster's office. He loved the tune and wanted to record it as a duet. It was simply meant to be—the song landed with the singer we wanted." Gordon also felt the project had a happy ending. 
"It was an accidental duet, meaning it was never intended to be a duet—but the producers found ways to make it a duet, which ended up working out pretty well."

Now it was a matter of Cetera deciding who would be his singing partner. "'I was looking for somebody who wasn't that logical a choice,' he explained. 'Actually, I was going to use an "unknown" singer until someone at my record company suggested Amy Grant,'" who had thus far only been known for Contemporary Christian music. "I thought she was a great choice because she was looking to make a pop crossover, and I like what she stands for. She was real excited about the idea, too." That's not to say that Grant was without reservations. Caldwell noted, "Cetera really wanted her to record the duet with him, but she was so devoutly religious that she wanted to vet the songwriters before she would commit to recording the song. I had to go to A&M Records to meet with her. Obviously, I was on my very best behavior that day [he laughs]. I'm sure Paul had to go through the same process."

After the song was recorded, a music video was filmed at the Park Plaza Hotel in downtown Los Angeles, California, under the direction of Dominic Sena. The clip consists of shots of Cetera and Grant's lip-syncing that are interwoven with footage of the movements of a large group of dancers.

Personnel 

 Peter Cetera – vocals
 Amy Grant – vocals
 Michael Omartian – keyboards
 Willie Alexander – Fairlight CMI
 Steve Azbill – PPG Waveterm programming
 Erich Bulling – synthesizers, drum programming
 Dann Huff – guitars
 Chester Thompson – drums
 Jeff Porcaro – percussion
 Kenny Cetera – additional percussion

Chart success

"The Next Time I Fall" debuted on the Hot 100 in the issue of Billboard dated September 20, 1986, and enjoyed 21 weeks there, one of which was spent at number one. Its first appearance on the magazine's Adult Contemporary chart followed in the September 27 issue and resulted in two weeks in the top spot during a run that lasted 22 weeks.

Charts

Cover versions

Caldwell recorded the song for his 1988 album Heart of Mine.

References

Bibliography

External links

1986 songs
1986 singles
Peter Cetera songs
Amy Grant songs
Bobby Caldwell songs
Billboard Hot 100 number-one singles
RPM Top Singles number-one singles
Male–female vocal duets
Songs written by Bobby Caldwell
Song recordings produced by Michael Omartian
Music videos directed by Dominic Sena
Pop ballads
1980s ballads
Warner Records singles
Songs written by Paul Gordon (composer)